Here Before may refer to:
 Here Before (album), a 2011 album by the Feelies
 Here Before (film), an upcoming British thriller film directed by Stacey Gregg